Anna Vasilyevna Kareyeva (born 10 May 1977) is a Russian handball player who competed internationally with the Russian national team. She has won the World Championship three times (2001, 2005 and 2007) and she also received a silver medal in the 2008 Summer Olympics.

References

1977 births
Living people
Sportspeople from Adygea
Russian female handball players
Handball players at the 2008 Summer Olympics
Olympic handball players of Russia
Olympic silver medalists for Russia
Olympic medalists in handball
Medalists at the 2008 Summer Olympics